Marcus Piossek (born 21 July 1989) is a professional footballer who plays as a midfielder for SV Meppen. Born in Germany, he has represented both Germany and Poland at youth level.

Club career
Born in Lippstadt, Marcus Piossek first played for SV Lippstadt 08 as a youth, before moving to Borussia Dortmund in 2004. From the 2006–07 season he was sporadically deployed in the second senior team in the Regionalliga. On 25 July 2009, he made his professional debut in the 3. Liga in the season opener 4–3 defeat at Wacker Burghausen.

In June 2010, he moved to Rot Weiss Ahlen on a one-year contract. After 2010–11 season, he joined 2.Bundesliga club Karlsruher SC.

In 2017, Sportfreunde Lotte announced the signing of Piossek on a two-year contract from SC Paderborn.

International career
In 2009 Piossek was appointed for the first time in a selection team of the German Football Association. He played one game for Germany U20 against Switzerland U20, before switching his allegiance to Poland. On 17 November 2009, he made his single appearance for the Polish under-21 national team against Romania U21.

References

External links
 

Living people
1989 births
People from Lippstadt
Sportspeople from Arnsberg (region)
German people of Polish descent
Citizens of Poland through descent
Polish footballers
German footballers
Footballers from North Rhine-Westphalia
Association football midfielders
Germany youth international footballers
Poland under-21 international footballers
Borussia Dortmund II players
SC Preußen Münster players
VfL Osnabrück players
Rot Weiss Ahlen players
Karlsruher SC players
Karlsruher SC II players
1. FC Kaiserslautern players
SC Paderborn 07 players
Sportfreunde Lotte players
SV Meppen players
2. Bundesliga players
3. Liga players
Regionalliga players